The Van Nuys Government Center (aka Van Nuys Civic Center or San Fernando Valley Administrative Center) is a  cluster of buildings in the Van Nuys neighborhood of Los Angeles that houses various local, state and federal government offices and services. It is an important regional hub in the decentralized city of Los Angeles, roughly by bounded by Calvert Street, Sylvan Street, Tyrone Avenue and Van Nuys Boulevard. (Similar hubs include West Valley Civic Center in Reseda and West Los Angeles Civic Center in Sawtelle.)

Many of the buildings are fronted by open plaza and garden areas established in 1966 in the area "surrounded by the Valley Police Headquarters, Van Nuys Library and county courts building under construction."

Access
A city-operated parking structure is located at 14517 Erwin Street.

Van Nuys station and the Orange Line Bikeway for cyclists and pedestrians are one block away from the government center.

The Van Nuys/Studio City DASH loop has served the Van Nuys Government Center since 1992.

References

External links
 San Fernando Valley Administrative Center historic survey

Van Nuys, Los Angeles
San Fernando Valley
Government of Los Angeles
Government of Los Angeles County, California